Dogfight is an aerial combat video game written by Bill Basham for the Apple II and published by Micro Lab in 1980.  The game is a clone of Atari, Inc.'s 1975 arcade game Jet Fighter.

Gameplay
The player controls an aircraft  that always moves in the direction is it pointed and can be rotated left or right and shoot. The screen wraps around at the edges, such that a player heading off the right edge of the screen will re-enter from the left.

Players can play solo against the computer or up to 8 humans can play against each other. Since all input is via the single built-in keyboard of the Apple II, this involves the players crowding up against each other to reach their 3 keys. Each plane is identified by a number drawn next to it.

When a plane is shot, it becomes a parachuting figure, which transits the screen from top to bottom a few times and also may be shot.

Development
The game was written by Bill Basham in Rockford, Illinois. He began programming the Apple II in  machine language and wanted to explore animation. He was able to smoothly animate up to 56 items on the screen at the same time, optimized with a lookup table.

Reception
Dogfight was number 6 on Softalk'''s "The Top Thirty" list in the February 1981 issue.

Legacy
Programmer Bill Basham: "After writing Dogfight and publishing it through Microlab, I went on to write Diversi-DOS. Microlab wasn't selling Dogfight by then, so I decided to include it as a freebee with Diversi-DOS".Dogfight II'' is a 1981 update with support for the Joyport device and two new game modes: multiplayer and anti-aircraft gunner.

References

1980 video games
Apple II games
Apple II-only games
Multidirectional shooters
Video game clones
Video games developed in the United States
Multiplayer and single-player video games